Bukarester FC was a football club from Bucharest, Romania. It represented the local German community from Bucharest at the round of the 20th century, with most of the players being ethnic Germans.

History
Bukarester FC (German: Bucharester FC) was the third club of Bucharest founded in 1912, after Olympia București and Colentina București. They played in Divizia A for 4 years before the start of World War I.

Most players were Germans, employees of different industries, working in Bucharest. On March 18, 1912 they played the first match with Olympia București lost 4–2.

The main sponsor of the team since 1914 was IHC (International Harwester Company). The first president of the club was Cyril Hense Senior. With the beginning of World War I foreign players left the country, and the team gradually disbanded. They still active until 1916 when they completely disappeared.

They used same stadium as rivals Colțea București, a ground located in "Bolta Rece", the current Stadionul Arcul de Triumf, next to Arcul de Triumf and next to Herăstrău Park.

Divizia A History

Honours
Runners-up (2): 1913–14, 1915–16
Third Place (2): 1912–13, 1914–15

See also
Regat Germans

References

Books
 Istoria Fotbalului Românesc, vol. I, 1909–1944.
 Fotbal de la A la Z (1984) – Editura Sport-Turism – autori Mihai Ionescu, Mircea Tudoran.
 Enciclopedia Educaţiei fizice şi sportului din România, vol. III București, Editura Aramis, 2002.

Category

Defunct football clubs in Romania
Football clubs in Bucharest
History of Bucharest
1912 establishments in Romania
1916 disestablishments in Romania